Jackson State University (Jackson State or JSU) is a public historically black research university in Jackson, Mississippi. It is one of the largest HBCUs in the United States and the fourth largest university in Mississippi in terms of student enrollment. The university is a member of the Thurgood Marshall College Fund and classified among "R2: Doctoral Universities – High research activity".

Jackson State University's athletic teams, the Tigers, participate in NCAA Division I athletics as a member of the Southwestern Athletic Conference (SWAC). Jackson State is also the home of the Sonic Boom of the South, a marching band founded in the 1940s. Their accompanying danceline, the Prancing J-Settes, are well known for their unique style of dance, known as J-Setting.

History

Jackson State University developed from Natchez Seminary, founded October 23, 1877, in Natchez, Mississippi.  The seminary was affiliated with the American Baptist Home Mission Society of New York, who established it "for the moral, religious, and intellectual improvement of Christian leaders of the colored people of Mississippi and the neighboring states".  In 1883, the school changed its name to Jackson College and moved from Natchez to a site in Jackson, the capital. Today that site serves as the campus of Millsaps College.

Jackson College moved to its current location early in the 20th century, where it developed into a full state university.

In 1934, during the Great Depression, The Baptist Society withdrew financial support. The school became a state-supported public institution in 1940, known as the Mississippi Negro Training School.  The name has since been changed to express development: Jackson College for Negro Teachers (1944). After desegregation, Jackson State College (1967); with the addition of graduate programs and expanded curriculum, Jackson State University (1974).

Many students at Jackson State College became active in the civil rights movement. Work to gain integrated practice and social justice continued after civil rights legislation was passed in the mid-1960s. During an on-campus protest on May 14, 1970, two students were killed by police gunfire. An additional 12 students were injured by gunfire during the clash. A dormitory still bears the bullet marks fired on that day.

The university drew national attention in 2023 when the faculty senate voted "no confidence" in university president Thomas Hudson. They alleged that he "repeatedly failed to respect shared governance, transparency, and accountability". Shortly thereafter, the university's board of trustees placed Hudson on administrative leave and appointed Elayne Hayes-Anthony the acting president.

Campuses

It is located at 1400 John R. Lynch Street between Prentiss and Dalton Streets.

Ayer Hall was constructed in 1903 and is the oldest structure on the main campus. It was named in honor of the first president of the institution, Charles Ayer. The building was listed on the National Register of Historic Places in 1977. Green-Gibb Pedestrian Walkway was named in honor of the two young men who died in the Jackson State shooting in 1970. As a result of the landmark "Ayers Settlement" in 2002, the university, along with the other two public HBCUs in the state, has completed extensive renovations and upgrades to campus.

Jackson State has satellite campuses throughout the Jackson Metropolitan area:

 Universities Center (Ridgewood Road)
 Madison campus
 Holmes campus
 Mississippi E-Center
 Downtown (100 Capitol Street)

Organization and administration

Governance 
The board of trustees is the constitutional governing body of the Mississippi State Institutions of Higher Learning. This body appoints the president of the university. There are 575 faculty and 1,431 staff; 54% of the faculty are tenured, teaching approximately 7,000 undergraduate and graduate students.

JSU presidents 
Interim presidents excluded
1877–1894: Charles Ayer
1894–1911: Luther G. Barrett
1911–1927: Zachary T. Hubert
1927–1940: B. Baldwin Dansby
1940–1967: Jacob L. Reddix
1967–1984: John A. Peoples, Jr.
1984–1991: James A. Hefner
1992–1999: James E. Lyons, Sr.
2000–2010: Ronald Mason Jr.
2011–2016: Carolyn Meyers
2017–2020: William B. Bynum
2020–present: Thomas Hudson

Academics

JSU colleges and schools include:
 College of Business
 College of Education and Human Development
 College of Liberal Arts
 College of Health Sciences
 College of Science, Engineering and Technology
 W.E.B. Du Bois – Maria Luisa Alvarez Harvey Honors College
 School of Life Long Learning

Teaching and learning 
In 2015, JSU became the first university in Mississippi approved by the legislature to establish a School of Public Health which is housed under the  College of Health Sciences. JSU is the only university in Mississippi to earn two consecutive "Apple Distinguished School" distinctions. Apple Inc. biennially acknowledges schools that uniquely incorporate technology into its curriculum. Since 2012, Jackson State University has provided all first-time, full-time freshmen brand new iPads to increase technology usage on campus. JSU is the first and only HBCU in Mississippi to support a bachelor's and master's level engineering program. JSU is one of only two universities in Mississippi with a comprehensive meteorology undergraduate level degree program. The W.E.B. Du Bois – Maria Luisa Alvarez Harvey Honors College is a selective interdisciplinary college at the university that provides a unique academic experience for the most high-achieving undergraduate students.

Academic Centers 
The Margaret Walker Center is an archive and museum dedicated to the preservation, interpretation, and dissemination of African American history and culture
The COFO Civil Rights Education Center focuses on hosting conversations on civil rights and developing future leaders and community developers
The Richard Wright Center was established to help students improve their writing and presentation skills through various types of resources and tutoring

Military Science 
Tiger Battalion, the university's Army ROTC program is the host US Army ROTC program for Belhaven University, Delta State University, Hinds Community College, Millsaps College, Mississippi College, Mississippi College School of Law, Mississippi Valley State University, Tougaloo College, and University of Mississippi Medical Center's School of Nursing. Air Force Detachment 006 is the Air Force ROTC Component for the Jackson metropolitan area. Hosted at Jackson State, it also serves students from Belhaven University, Millsaps College, Mississippi College and Tougaloo College.

Athletics

Jackson State is a member of the Division I Football Championship Subdivision (FCS) and the Southwestern Athletic Conference. Currently, JSU fields teams in basketball, track and field, cross country, baseball, softball, golf, tennis, soccer, bowling, volleyball, and football. The university's mascot is the Tiger, and the teams are sometimes referred to as the "Blue Bengals."

The JSU Tigers football team alumni includes Pro Football Hall of Famers Lem Barney, Jackie Slater and Walter Payton, and former Jacksonville Jaguars wide receiver Jimmy Smith.

JSU participates in a number of notable football games with rival colleges. These include:

Orange Blossom Classic - played against Florida A&M in Miami 
Jackson State's homecoming football game is annually one of the highest attended and most anticipated home games
Jackson State–Southern University rivalry – played on a rotating home-and-home schedule
 Soul Bowl (formerly Capital City Classic) – played against Alcorn State on a rotating home-and-home schedule

Sonic Boom of the  South

The marching band began in the 1940s at what was then Jackson State College, under the directorship of Frederick D. Hall, who had directed a band at the college as early as the 1920s, in addition to the chorus and orchestra. It was initially made up of students from Jackson College and Lanier High School. Founded as the Jackson State University Marching Band, the name "Sonic Boom of the South" was adopted by the school in 1971, after having been suggested by band members. The first full-time band director, William W. Davis, was appointed in 1948, replacing Charles Saulsburg, who had been director since 1947. Davis had previously played trumpet in Cab Calloway's band, and Calloway's musical style and showmanship influenced Davis's conceptualization of the marching band. The band at this time had around 20 members, increasing to 88 in 1963. Davis retired as director in 1971, but remained the chief arranger for the band. He was replaced by Harold J. Haughton. Haughton was instrumental in the creation of the Prancing J-Settes, the band's accompanying danceline.

Student life

Student body
As of fall 2017, 75% of Jackson State's student community was from Mississippi, with the majority from Hinds County and Madison County.  The top three feeder states were Illinois (419 students), Louisiana (227), and Tennessee (192). China accounted for the highest number of international students on campus. 90% of students identified as Black, 6% identified as white, and 4% identified with various race categories. 34% of students were male, and 66% of students were female.

Student organizations

Jackson State University offers over 100 registered student organizations on campus.  There are academic, residential, religious, Greek, and special interest groups established to serve the diverse interests of JSU's student community. All student organizations are governed under the Student Affairs division.

National Pan Hellenic Council
Jackson State University's National Pan Hellenic Council (NPHC) includes all nine NPHC organizations:

 Gamma Rho, Alpha Kappa Alpha sorority
 Delta Pi, Delta Sigma Theta sorority
 Upsilon Epsilon, Omega Psi Phi fraternity
 Delta Phi, Alpha Phi Alpha fraternity
 Delta Delta, Kappa Alpha Psi fraternity
 Alpha Beta, Phi Beta Sigma fraternity
 Lambda Beta, Zeta Phi Beta sorority
 Alpha Tau, Sigma Gamma Rho sorority
 Delta Psi, Iota Phi Theta fraternity

Academic honor societies
Jackson State University offers over 30 academic honor societies for excelling students.

 Alpha Chi National Honor Society
Alpha Epsilon Lambda National Honor Society
Alpha Kappa Delta Sociology Honor Society
Alpha Kappa Mu National Honor Society
Alpha Lambda Delta National Honor Society
Alpha Mu Gamma Foreign Language Honor Society
 Alpha Phi Sigma Criminal Justice Honor Society
 Alpha Psi Omega National Theatre Honor Society
Alpha Sigma Lambda Continuing Education Honor Society
Beta Beta Beta Biological Sciences Honor Society
Beta Gamma Sigma Business Honor Society
Beta Kappa Chi Mathematics/Natural Sciences Honor Society
Blue Key National Honor Society
 Chi Alpha Sigma Athletic Honor Society
Epsilon Pi Tau Technology Honor Society
 Golden Key International Honor Society
 Lambda Pi Eta Speech Communication & Theater Honor Society
 Lambda Sigma National Honor Society
National Society of Black Engineers
 The National Society of Collegiate Scholars
Phi Alpha Social Work Honor Society
Phi Alpha Alpha Public Policy & Administration Honor Society
Phi Alpha Theta History Honor Society
Phi Epsilon Kappa Physical Ed. Honor Society
Phi Kappa Phi National Honor Society
Phi Theta Kappa International Honor Society
Pi Lambda Theta Education Honor Society
Pi Mu Epsilon Mathematics Honor Society 
Pi Sigma Alpha Political Science Honor Society
Psi Chi Psychology Honor Society
Sigma Pi Sigma Physics Honor Society
Sigma Tau Delta English Honor Society
 Tau Sigma Transfer Honor Society

Campus media
Jackson State is home to radio station WJSU-88.5 FM which plays jazz, gospel, news and public affairs programming. Jackson State University also owns a television station, W23BC known as JSUTV aired on Comcast. Jackson State also publishes the independent Blue and White Flash weekly student newspaper and the Jacksonian magazine, which features news and highlights about the university, its students, and alumni.

Notable alumni

Education

Arts, TV and radio media, entertainment and music

Politics, law, and government

Sports

Honorary

See also

 Jackson State University Botanical Garden

References

External links 
 

 
Public universities and colleges in Mississippi
Historically black universities and colleges in the United States
Universities and colleges accredited by the Southern Association of Colleges and Schools
Educational institutions established in 1877
1877 establishments in Mississippi
Universities and colleges in the Jackson metropolitan area, Mississippi
Education in Jackson, Mississippi
Buildings and structures in Jackson, Mississippi